The Australian One and a Half Litre Championship was a CAMS sanctioned national motor racing title contested annually from 1964 to 1968. It was open to drivers of cars complying with the Australian 1½ Litre Formula which specified open wheel racing cars fitted with unsupercharged engines using commercially available fuel and limited to 1500cc capacity. The title was staged over a single race in the first two years and over a series of races in the last three.

Results

References

CAMS Manual of Motor Sport, 1964
Australian Motor Sport, October 1964
CAMS Manual of Motor Sport, 1965
Sports Car World, June 1965
CAMS Manual of Motor Sport, 1966
Racing Car News, January 1967
CAMS Manual of Motor Sport, 1967
Racing Car News, January 1968
CAMS Manual of Motor Sport, 1968
Racing Car News, December 1968
www.camsmanual.com.au

 
One and
1964 establishments in Australia
1968 disestablishments in Australia
Sports leagues established in 1964
Sports leagues disestablished in 1968